The Matrouz designates a Judeo-Arabic artistic and musical concept. Its origins go back to Andalusia and it was often practiced by Jewish Andalusian who were mixing both Hebrew with Arabic in exceptional harmony.

Meaning
The Matrouz word is an Arabic word that means "embroidred", as a reference to inserting Arabic stanzas in Hebrew poetry.

The Matrouz represents an artistic connection between different cultures taking its inspiration from the Jewish, Muslim and Christian melting pot of multicultural Andalusia.

See also
 Andalusian classical music
 Sanaa (music)

References

North African music
Jewish culture of al-Andalus